The MK postcode area, also known as the Milton Keynes postcode area, is a group of 26 postcode districts in England, within five post towns. These cover north Buckinghamshire (including Milton Keynes, Buckingham, Newport Pagnell and Olney), west and north Bedfordshire (including Bedford) and very small parts of Northamptonshire, Oxfordshire and Cambridgeshire.



Coverage
The approximate coverage of the postcode districts:

|-
! MK1
|MILTON KEYNES
|Denbigh, Mount Farm
|Milton Keynes
|-
! MK2
|MILTON KEYNES
|Brickfields, Central Bletchley, Fenny Stratford, Water Eaton
|Milton Keynes
|-
! MK3
|MILTON KEYNES
|Church Green, Far Bletchley, Old Bletchley, Newton Leys, West Bletchley
|Milton Keynes; Buckinghamshire
|-
! MK4
|MILTON KEYNES
|Emerson Valley, Furzton, Kingsmead, Oxley Park, Shenley Brook End, Snelshall West, Tattenhoe, Tattenhoe Park, Westcroft, Whaddon, Woodhill
|Milton Keynes; Buckinghamshire
|-
! MK5
|MILTON KEYNES
|Crownhill, Elfield Park, Grange Farm, Oakhill, Knowlhill, Loughton, Medbourne, Shenley Brook End, Shenley Church End, Shenley Lodge, Shenley Wood
|Milton Keynes
|-
! MK6
|MILTON KEYNES
|Ashland, Beanhill, Bleak Hall, Coffee Hall, Eaglestone, Fishermead, Leadenhall, Netherfield, Oldbrook, Peartree Bridge, Redmoor, Springfield, Tinkers Bridge, Woughton on the Green, Woughton Park, Simpson, Winterhill
|Milton Keynes
|-
! MK7
|MILTON KEYNES
|Browns Wood, Caldecotte, Kents Hill, Tilbrook, Walton, Walton Hall, Wavendon, Wavendon Gate, Old Farm Park
|Milton Keynes
|-
! MK8
|MILTON KEYNES
|Crownhill, Grange Farm, Great Holm, Hazeley, Loughton, Loughton Lodge, Two Mile Ash, Whitehouse, Wymbush
|Milton Keynes
|-
! MK9
|MILTON KEYNES
|Central Milton Keynes, Campbell Park
|Milton Keynes
|-
! MK10
|MILTON KEYNES
|Brinklow, Broughton, Kingston, Middleton, Monkston, Oakgrove
|Milton Keynes
|-
! MK11
|MILTON KEYNES
|Fairfields, Fullers Slade, Galley Hill, Kiln Farm, Stony Stratford
|Milton Keynes
|-
! MK12
|MILTON KEYNES
|Greenleys, Hodge Lea, Old Wolverton, Stacey Bushes, Wolverton, Wolverton Mill
|Milton Keynes
|-
! MK13
|MILTON KEYNES
|Bancroft/Bancroft Park, Blue Bridge, Bradwell and Bradwell Abbey, Bradwell Common, New Bradwell, Heelands, Stonebridge
|Milton Keynes
|-
! MK14
|MILTON KEYNES
|Blakelands, Conniburrow, Downs Barn, Giffard Park, Great Linford, Linford Wood, Oakridge Park, Stantonbury, Neath Hill, Redhouse Park
|Milton Keynes
|-
! MK15
|MILTON KEYNES
|Bolbeck Park, Downhead Park, Fox Milne, Newlands, Pennyland, Pineham, Northfield, Tongwell, Willen Park, Willen, Willen Lake, Great Woolstone, Little Woolstone
|Milton Keynes
|-
! MK16
|NEWPORT PAGNELL
|Astwood, Broughton, Chicheley, Filgrave, Gayhurst, Hardmead, Lathbury, Little Crawley, Moulsoe, North Crawley, Newport Pagnell, Sherington, Stoke Goldington, Tyringham
|Milton Keynes
|-
! MK17
|MILTON KEYNES
|Aspley Guise, Battlesden, Bow Brickhill, Drayton Parslow, Eversholt, Great Brickhill, Great Horwood, Hulcote, Little Brickhill, Little Horwood, Milton Bryan, Mursley, Nash, Newton Longville, Potsgrove, Salford, Stoke Hammond, Swanbourne, Thornton, Tingrith, Wavendon, Whaddon, Woburn, Woburn Sands
|Buckinghamshire; Central Bedfordshire; Milton Keynes
|-
! MK18
|BUCKINGHAM
|Addington, Adstock, Akeley, Barton Hartshorn, Botolph Claydon, Buckingham, Calvert, Chackmore, Chetwode, Dadford, Dunton, East Claydon, Finmere, Foscott, Gawcott, Granborough, Hillesden, Hoggeston, Leckhamstead, Lillingstone Dayrell, Lillingstone Lovell, Maids Moreton, Middle Claydon, Newton Purcell, North Marston, Padbury, Shalstone, Steeple Claydon, Tingewick, Thornborough, Water Stratford, Winslow
|Buckinghamshire; Cherwell
|-
! MK19
|MILTON KEYNES
| Beachampton, Calverton, Castlethorpe, Cosgrove, Deanshanger, Hanslope, Haversham, Little Linford, Long Street, Old Stratford, Passenham, Upper Weald, Wicken
|Buckinghamshire; Milton Keynes; West Northamptonshire
|-
! MK40
|BEDFORD
|Biddenham, Castle, De Parys, Great Denham, Harpur, Queens Park
|Bedford
|-
! MK41
|BEDFORD
|Brickhill, Clapham, De Parys, Goldington, Harpur, Newnham, Putnoe, Renhold, Salph End
|Bedford
|-
! MK42
|BEDFORD
|Castle, Cauldwell, Elstow, Harrowden, Kempston, Kingsbrook, Shortstown, Wixams
|Bedford
|-
! MK43
|BEDFORD
|Bourne End, Brogborough, Box End, Bromham, Cranfield, Carlton, Felmersham, Harrold, Husborne Crawley, Keeley Green, Kempston Rural, Lidlington, Lower Shelton, Marston Moretaine, Newton Blossomville, Oakley, Odell, Pavenham, Podington, Radwell, Ridgmont, Stagsden, Stevington, Stewartby, Turvey, Upper Shelton, West End, Wood End, Wootton, Wootton Green
|Bedford; Central Bedfordshire
|-
! MK44
|BEDFORD
|Begwary, Bletsoe, Blunham, Bolnhurst, Cardington, Chawston, Colesden, Colmworth, Cople, Duck's Cross, Great Barford, Keysoe, Keysoe Row, Kingsbrook, Knotting, Knotting Green, Little Staughton, Melchbourne, Milton Ernest, Moggerhanger, Pertenhall, Ravensden, Riseley, Roxton, Sharnbrook, Souldrop, Swineshead, Thurleigh, Top End, Wilden, Willington, Wyboston, Yelden
|Bedford; Huntingdonshire
|-
! MK45
|BEDFORD
|Ampthill, Barton-le-Clay, Clophill, Cotton End, Flitton, Flitwick, Gravenhurst, Greenfield, Haynes, Haynes Church End, Herring's Green, Houghton Conquest, How End, Kempston Hardwick, Maulden, Millbrook, Pulloxhill, Sharpenhoe, Silsoe, Steppingley, Westoning, Wilstead
|Bedford; Central Bedfordshire
|-
! MK46
|OLNEY
|Clifton Reynes, Cold Brayfield, Emberton, Lavendon, Olney, Ravenstone, Warrington, Weston Underwood
|Milton Keynes
|-
! MK77
|MILTON KEYNES
|Morgan Stanley Processing Centre (otherwise in MK11)
|Milton Keynes
|}

Map

See also
Postcode Address File
List of postcode areas in the United Kingdom

References

External links
Royal Mail's Postcode Address File
A quick introduction to Royal Mail's Postcode Address File (PAF)

Milton Keynes
Postcode areas covering South East England
Postcode areas covering the East of England
Postcode areas covering the East Midlands